Victor Gallo (born December 8, 1991) is a Canadian soccer player who plays for Scrosoppi FC in League1 Ontario.

Playing career 
Gallo began his career in 2009 with the North York Astros of the Canadian Soccer League.

In 2014, he appeared for Internacional de Toronto in League1 Ontario, scoring in his debut against Windsor Stars. After Internacional was removed from the league, he joined the Woodbridge Strikers.

In 2015, he went abroad to Uruguay to sign with Canadian Soccer Club of the Uruguayan Segunda División. During his time with the club he appeared in 6 matches.    

Beginning in 2017, he began playing for Oakville Blue Devils FC in League1 Ontario. On May 19, 2017, he made his debut for the Blue Devils and scored his first goal with a chip shot from 40 yards out against FC London. During his time with the Blue Devils, he served as team captain. In 2017, he was named to the mid-season all-star game against the PLSQ all-stars and was named to the year-end Third Team All-Star. In 2019, he was named a Second Team All-Star.

In 2022, he joined ProStars FC.

In 2023, he signed with Scrosoppi FC.

Notes

References 

1991 births
Living people
Association football defenders
Canadian expatriate soccer players
Canadian Soccer League (1998–present) players
Canadian soccer players
Canadian Soccer Club players
League1 Ontario players
North York Astros players
Blue Devils FC players
Soccer players from Toronto
Uruguayan Segunda División players
Internacional de Toronto players
ProStars FC players
Woodbridge Strikers players
Scrosoppi FC players